Gloucester City may refer to:

Gloucester City A.F.C., an English football club
Gloucester City, New Jersey, a city in the United States
Gloucester, Ontario, a former city in Ontario, amalgamated into the City of Ottawa in 2001